Graf is an ancient German and Swiss rooted name. In the United States, there are 16,620 people with this last name making it the 2445th most popular surname. Some notable people with this surname include:

 Al Graf (born 1958), American politician and attorney
 Alesia Graf (born 1980), Belarusian-born German professional boxer
 Alexander Graf (born 1962), Uzbekistani-German chess grandmaster
 Alicia Graf Mack (born 1978/79), American dancer and teacher
 Allan Graf (born 1949), American athlete, actor, stuntman and director
 Anton Graf (1811-1867), German theologian, private docent at University of Tübingen
 Andreas Christoph Graf (1701–1776 Augsburg), teacher, poet & author of "The Polite Student" (1745)
 Andreas Graf (born 1985), Australian track cyclist
 Béatrice Graf (born 1964), Swiss musician
 Bernadette Graf (born 1992), German judoka
 Carl Graf (1892-1947), American painter
 Conrad Graf (1782–1851), Austrian-German pianoforte builder
 Christian Ernst Graf (1723–1804), from 1764 on called "Graaf", German/Netherland composer (Johann's son)
 Christoph Graf (born 1961), 35th Commander of the Pontifical Swiss Guard
 Claudio Graf (born 1976), Argentine football coach and former player
 Clyde Graf, New Zealand politician
 Dajuan Graf (born 1962), American basketball player
 Daniel Graf (born 1977), German football player
 Dominik Graf (born 1952), German film director 
 Edward L. Graf (1878-?), American politician
 Elfi Graf (born 1952), Austrian folk singer
  (1909–1988), Swiss artist
 Erwin Graf (1917–2005), American basketball player
  (17th cent), German politician Bavaria
 Friedrich Hartmann Graf (1727–1795), German Composer (Johann's son)
 Frigyes Gráf (1884-?), Hungarian gymnast
 Georg Graf, German Orientalist 
 Gismo Graf (born 1992), German musician 
 Haakon Graf (born 1955), Norwegian musician
 Hannah Graf, former officer of the British Army and a transgender rights activist
 Hedy Graf (1926-1997), Spanish-born Swiss soprano
 Herbert Graf (1903-1973), Austrian-American opera producer
 Hermann Graf (1912-1988), German Luftwaffe World War II fighter ace
 Holly Graf (born c. 1963), U.S. naval officer
 Jake Graf, English actor
 Jessica Graf (born 1990), American reality television personality, actress, and model
 Jochen Graf (1989), American soccer player
 Joe Graf Jr. (born 1998), American professional stock car racing driver
 Johann Graf (born 1946), German composer (father of Friedrich C. and Christian E. Graf)
 John Graf (born 1968), Canadian rugby player
 Jürgen Graf (born 1951), Swiss historian
 Jürgen-Peter Graf (born 1952), German lawyer and judge
 Karl Heinrich Graf (1815–1869), German Old Testament scholar and orientalist
 Kathryn Graf (born 1958), American actress and playwright
 Kevin Graf (born 1991), American football offensive tackle
 Klaus Graf (born 1969), German racing driver
 -Selinger (born 1967), Austrian Architect & Urbanist (Arch. without Frontiers), former diplomat. service, later on Ambassador of "good will", Researcher & Author
 Lisa Graf (born 1992), German swimmer
  (born 1999), German football player
 Marcus Graf (born 1974), German art curator, writer and artist based in Istanbul
 Martin Graf (born 1960), Austrian politician
 Max Graf (1873-1958), Austrian composer and music critic
 Maya Graf (born 1962), Swiss politician
 Michael Graf, Italian luger
 Mirosław Graf (born 1959), Polish Ski Jumper
 Oskar Maria Graf (1894–1967), German poet and novelist
 Paul David Graf (1950–2001), American actor
 Ulrich Graf (1878-1950), early member of the Nazi Party
 Urs Graf (1485 – c. 1529), Swiss Renaissance painter and engraver
 Rahel Graf (born 1989), Swiss footballer
 Randy Graf (born 1957), former member of the Arizona State House
 Rebekah Graf, American actress
 Rick Graf (born 1964), American football linebacker
 Robert Graf (1923-1966), German actor
 Rolf Graf (born 1932), Swiss cyclist
 Rolf Graf (musician) (1960–2013), Norwegian musician
 Santiago Graf (1845-1904), Swiss born brewer and businessman in Mexico
 Shaun Graf (borb 1957), Australian first-class cricketeer
 Sonja Graf (1908-1965), German and American chess player
 Susanne Graf (born 1992), German politician
 Steffi Graf (born 1969), German tennis player
 Stephanie Graf (born 1973), Austrian athlete
 Willi Graf (1918–1943), German martyr of 20th century, member of the White Rose resistance group in Nazi Germany
  (16th cent), German lawyer Nördlingen

See also
 Graff (disambiguation)
 Graaf (disambiguation)
 Graf
 Grafs (disambiguation)

Occupational surnames
German-language surnames